Grace Wales Bonner  (born 1990) is an English fashion designer, whose work "proposes a distinct notion of cultural luxury that infuses European heritage with an Afro Atlantic spirit". Her designs are characterized by a blend of sportswear and tailoring, as well as her interest in infusing everyday wardrobe essentials with a refined elegance. In 2014 she founded the London-based label Wales Bonner, originally specializing in menswear.

Since founding her eponymous brand, Wales Bonner has received numerous awards including Emerging Menswear Designer at the British Fashion Awards (2015), the LVMH Young Designer Prize (2016), Winner of the British Fashion Council/ Vogue Designer Fashion Fund (2019) and CFDA International Men's Designer of the Year (2021), and in June 2022 she was appointed Member of the Order of the British Empire (MBE) for services to fashion. Wales Bonner currently serves as the Head of the Department of Fashion Design at the University of Applied Arts, Vienna.

Biography
She was born in South London to a white English mother and Jamaican father, and after her parents' separation was brought up between her mother's house in Dulwich and her father's in Stockwell.

Wales Bonner studied at Central Saint Martins art school, graduating in 2014, and winning the L'Oréal Professionnel Talent award for her BA collection "Afrique". Subsequent awards she has received include the "Emerging Talent – Menswear" at the 2015 British Fashion Awards, the 2016 LVMH Prize for Young Fashion Designers, the British Fashion Council/ Vogue Designer Fashion Fund (2019), and the CFDA International Men's Designer of the Year (2021).

In 2019 she curated her debut show, A Time For New Dreams, for the Serpentine Sackler Gallery, which was an exploration of magical resonances within black cultural and aesthetic practices, and focused on the shrine “as a symbolic pathway for imagining different worlds and possibilities”. The exhibition, which attracted 25,000 visitors, took its name from a collection of essays by Nigerian writer Ben Okri, and included work by several artists (including Chino Amobi, Black Audio Film Collective, David Hammons, Rotimi Fani-Kayode, Liz Johnson Artur, Rashid Johnson, Kapwani Kiwanga, Eric N. Mack and  Paul Mpagi Sepuya), featuring Okri's words on the wall, as well as footage of African-American writer Ishmael Reed. According to Hans-Ulrich Obrist, artistic director of the Serpentine Gallery: "Grace is a fashion designer, but she’s also a thinker, a writer, an editor. She makes connections between different fields, from music to art."

In that same year, Grace was invited by Maria Grazia Chiuri to collaborate with Dior to re-interpret the house's New Look silhouette for its Resort 2020 collection. The following year, in 2020, Wales Bonner was recognized as one of the United Kingdom's most influential people of African or African Caribbean heritage by being included in the 2021 edition of the annual Powerlist.

Wales Bonner has collaborated with sportswear brand adidas Originals on a number of occasions, producing seasonal offerings that update and refine archival silhouettes. In 2022, she collaborated with renowned American artist Kerry James Marshall on a limited-edition T-shirt.

Wales Bonner was appointed Member of the Order of the British Empire (MBE) in the 2022 Birthday Honours for services to fashion.

Awards 
 2015: Emerging Menswear Designer at the British Fashion Awards
 2016: LVMH Young Designer Prize
 2019: Winner of the British Fashion Council/ Vogue Designer Fashion Fund
 2021: CFDA International Men's Designer of the Year
 2022: appointed Member of the Order of the British Empire (MBE)

References

External links

1992 births
Living people
Alumni of Central Saint Martins
Black British fashion people
British women fashion designers
English fashion designers
English people of Jamaican descent
Members of the Order of the British Empire